Chebii is a surname of Kenyan origin. Notable people with the surname include:

Abraham Chebii (born 1979), Kenyan track long-distance runner
Ezekiel Kiptoo Chebii (born 1991), Kenyan marathon runner

See also
Chebi (disambiguation)

Kalenjin names